The Mangaonuku Stream is a river in the Hawke's Bay region of the eastern North Island of New Zealand. It is a tributary of the Tukituki River, which it joins close to the town of Waipawa.

References

Rivers of the Hawke's Bay Region
Rivers of New Zealand